Winchester Hills is an area in Johannesburg, South Africa. Houses for sale in the region often sell for more than R 750,000.

History
Winchester Hills lies on land that once made up the farm called Ormonde, one of many large farms that make what is Johannesburg and its suburbs. It is named after Winchester, Hampshire in the United Kingdom and the elevated land that the suburb lies upon.

The anti-corruption whistleblower Babita Deokaran was murdered outside of her Winchester Hills home in August 2021.

References

Suburbs of Johannesburg